Alistair Hay (born 1955) is an Australian botanist. Hay is a former director of the Royal Botanic Garden, Sydney.

He is the heir presumptive to his older brother Charles Hay, 14th Marquess of Tweeddale (born 1947).

References

Living people
1955 births
20th-century Australian botanists
21st-century Australian botanists